Massi Joe E. Kiani (born September 16, 1964) is an Iranian-born American entrepreneur who founded medical technology company Masimo in 1989.

Early life 
Joe Kiani was born in Shiraz, Iran, and immigrated to the United States at the age of nine.   Kiani's father was an engineer and his mother was a nurse.  Despite not speaking more than three words in English when he arrived in the United States, he graduated from high school at the age of 15 and, by the time he was 22, had earned both his bachelor's (B.S.E.E) and master's (M.S.E.E) degrees in electrical engineering from San Diego State University.  SDSU later honored Kiani with the College of Engineering's 2005 Monty Award, recognizing his achievements and success.

Beginning in 1989, Kiani worked at Anthem Electronics. While with the company, Kiani detected an issue with the devices, and pitched the company a solution, which they declined. Following this, Kiani established his own business while maintaining a role with Anthem Electronics until 1991.

Career at Masimo 
Kiani founded the medical technology company Masimo in 1989 and was later joined by partner Mohammed Diab.   The company is publicly traded and employs more than 5,300 people worldwide. Kiani holds more than 500 patents or patent applications for advanced signal processing, optical sensors, and wearable technologies. Masimo pulse oximetry is used to monitor over 200 million patients per year  and is the primary pulse oximeter at 9 of the top 10 hospitals listed in the 2020-21 U.S. News & World Report Best Hospitals Honor Roll.   In 2011, Forbes named Masimo to its list of top 20 public companies under a billion dollars in revenue, based on earnings growth, sales growth, and return on equity.

Pulse oximetry is one of the most commonly used monitoring technologies in healthcare. Masimo makes a pulse oximetry technology known as Signal Extraction Technology (SET), which is the first pulse oximetry technology to reliably measure through motion and low perfusion conditions.

Since its introduction in 1995, Masimo SET pulse oximetry in over 100 independent and objective studies has outperformed other pulse oximetry technologies, providing increased sensitivity and specificity. Masimo SET helps clinicians reduce severe retinopathy of prematurity (ROP) in neonates and improve critical congenital heart disease (CCHD) screening in newborns. As of March 2021, ten published CCHD screening studies, all with positive conclusions and representing over 300,000 infants, including the largest CCHD study, have used Masimo SET. In addition, when used for continuous monitoring with a patient surveillance system, Masimo SET reduces rapid response team activations, ICU transfers, and costs.

In 2022, under Kiani's direction, Masimo acquired Sound United premium audio brands including Bowers & Wilkins, Polk Audio, Denon, Marantz, Definitive Technology, Classé and Boston Acoustics.

Industry reform and patient safety initiatives 
In 2002, Kiani was interviewed for a New York Times article titled "Medicine's Middleman" that focused on the practices of Group Purchasing Organizations (GPOs) and dominant medical suppliers. The article was followed by a series of 18 additional New York Times stories on GPOs over the next two years.  After the Times article appeared, The United States Senate Judiciary Subcommittee on Antitrust, Competition Policy, and Consumer Rights held four hearings regarding these practices, at which Kiani testified twice. Kiani's efforts led media to call Masimo "the poster child for small medical device manufacturers" and observe that Kiani "almost single-handedly galvanized the rancorous debate over the GPO industry's purported role in locking out innovative technologies from the marketplace."

Kiani is active in efforts to reform U.S. health care and encourage medical innovation. In 2010, Kiani and Masimo provided $10 million in funding to create the Masimo Foundation for Ethics, Innovation, and Competition in Healthcare, which is dedicated to encouraging and promoting activities that improve patient safety and deliver advanced healthcare worldwide.
Masimo Foundation supports third-party research, development initiatives, and clinical studies with an emphasis on transformative projects that seek to truly enhance patient safety and outcomes; helping to forge a world free of sickness, disease and inhumanity.

In September 2013, Kiani appeared before the Senate Health, Education, Labor & Pensions Committee and laid out five steps to help eradicate preventable patient deaths. That year, he also founded the Patient Safety Movement Foundation through the support of the Masimo Foundation. More than 200,000 preventable patient deaths occur each year in U.S. hospitals. The Patient Safety Movement is committed to reducing these deaths to zero by 2030. The foundation also convenes the action-oriented annual Patient Safety, Science & Technology summit. In 2017, at its 5th annual summit, the Patient Safety Movement Foundation announced that almost 70,000 lives had been saved and over 69 healthcare technology companies had pledged to share their data, helping to create an ecosystem for engineers to develop predictive algorithms that can help save even more lives. In 2020, the Patient Safety Movement Foundation was awarded a $5 million, five-year grant from the Masimo Foundation to help advance its mission and expedite its efforts.

Honors, awards, and additional philanthropic efforts 
In 2012, Kiani was named Ernst & Young National Entrepreneur of the Year, Life Sciences, for demonstrating commitment and vision in revolutionizing the health care industry through the creation and commercialization of innovative noninvasive patient monitoring technologies.

In 2014, Kiani was named by Becker's Hospital Review as one of "50 Experts Leading the Field of Patient Safety". Kiani was the only patient safety expert named who is also a medical technology company CEO. Kiani has subsequently been recognized on the same list of top 50 patient safety experts in 2015, 2016, and 2017.

In 2016, Kiani was asked by then-Vice President Joe Biden to put together a team of cancer researchers and experts to assist in the “Cancer Moonshot” initiative first announced by President Obama during the January 2016 State of the Union address, with the goal of speeding cancer treatments and ultimately eradicating cancer.

In 2017, Kiani was awarded an Honorary Doctorate of Science by Chapman University. This was followed by two additional honorary degrees: in 2019, Kiani was made an honorary member of the Mexican Academy of Surgery, and in 202, he was awarded an honorary Doctor of Science degree from San Diego State University (SDSU), originally due to be conferred in 2020 but delayed by the pandemic.

In 2018, the Intellectual Property Owners Education Foundation (IPOEF) honored Kiani with the first IP Champion Award, for "extraordinary leadership in advocating for the value of intellectual property to the progress of innovation."

In 2019, Kiani began serving on the Advisory Board of the University of California at Irvine (UCI) Susan and Henry Samueli College of Health Sciences.

In 2020, Kiani was honored by the Ibero-American Society of Neonatology (SIBEN) with the Award for Improvement of Neonatal Health in Latin America. He was also a recipient of a City of Hope Humanitarian Award, though the “Let’s Be Frank About Cancer” presentation gala was postponed due to the pandemic.

In 2020, Kiani joined Chris Evans and Mark Kassen in creating A Starting Point, a video-based civic engagement platform whose mission is to create a bipartisan channel of communication and connectivity between Americans and their elected officials, with the goal of creating a more informed electorate.

In 2021, Kiani began serving as a member of the Board of Trustees of the California Institute of Technology (Caltech), the Board of Councilors of the Carter Center, and the Chair of the Board Quality Committee of the Children’s Hospital of Orange County (CHOC).

In September 2021, Kiani was appointed to the President's Council of Advisors on Science and Technology (PCAST) by President Joe Biden.

References

External links
 Masimo Corporate Website
 Joe Kiani Featured in San Diego State University "In Touch" Magazine

American health care chief executives
American technology chief executives
Living people
1965 births
San Diego State University alumni